Eupithecia pseudotsugata is a moth in the family Geometridae. It is found in North America, including Alberta, British Columbia and Colorado.

References

Moths described in 1896
pseudotsugata
Moths of North America